The Wheatfield Fork Gualala River is a  stream in the mountains of western Sonoma County, California which empties into the South Fork Gualala River just east of Sea Ranch, California.

Course
Tributaries include:
Fuller Creek
Haupt Creek
Tobacco Creek
Elk Creek
House Creek
Wolf Creek
Tombs Creek

History

Habitat and pollution
As of 2000, the Wheatfield Fork and all its major tributaries supported steelhead trout.

Recreational paddling
After a significant amount of rainfall, the Wheatfield Fork has enough water for kayaking. It contains a 9.3 mile  class 1  wilderness section, an 8.7 mile  class 1  section near a road, and a steeper  class 2+  section.

Bridges
The bridge was built in 1974.

See also
List of rivers in California
List of watercourses in the San Francisco Bay Area

References

Rivers of Sonoma County, California
Rivers of Northern California